Gynacantha dobsoni is a species of dragonfly in the family Aeshnidae, 
known as the lesser duskhawker. 
It inhabits ponds and swamps and is found in northern Australia.

Gynacantha dobsoni is a large dull-coloured dragonfly with a constricted waist in its abdomen at segment 3. It is smaller than Gynacantha rosenbergi, which in many ways appears quite similar. From 35 specimens of Gynacantha dobsoni held in the Australian National Insect Collection at the CSIRO, an average wingspan of 109mm and overall length (including appendages) of 78mm has been determined.
It is a crepuscular insect and flies at dawn and dusk.

Gallery

See also
 List of Odonata species of Australia

References

Aeshnidae
Odonata of Australia
Taxa named by Frederic Charles Fraser
Insects described in 1951